The 2007 Croatian Figure Skating Championships ( took place between December 16 and 17, 2006 in Zagreb. Skaters competed in the disciplines of men's singles and ladies' singles.

Senior results

Men

Ladies

External links
 results

Croatian Figure Skating Championships
2006 in figure skating
Croatian Figure Skating Championships, 2007